Côte d'Ivoire competed at the 2013 World Championships in Athletics from August 10–18 in Moscow, Russia.

A team of 3 athletes was announced to represent the country in the event.

Results
(q – qualified, NM – no mark, SB – season best)
Men

Women

References

External links
Official local organising committee website
Official IAAF competition website

Nations at the 2013 World Championships in Athletics
World Championships in Athletics
Ivory Coast at the World Championships in Athletics